Sinatra '57 in Concert is a 1999 live album by the American singer Frank Sinatra. It is a complete recording of a concert performed at the Seattle Civic Auditorium on June 9, 1957. Arranger Nelson Riddle conducted the 26-piece orchestra at the event.

Production history
The album was first released as a bootleg, then digitally remastered and officially released by Artanis Entertainment Group from a recording made by Wally Heider. The restored version was released on 24-karat gold CD and "virgin vinyl" audiophile LP. Each numbered album included a 16-page pamphlet featuring an introduction by actor Kelsey Grammer and liner notes penned by Will Friedwald, author of Sinatra: The Song is You.

Track listing
The album contains 19 tracks:
Introduction - "You Make Me Feel So Young" (Mack Gordon, Josef Myrow) - 3:46 
"It Happened in Monterey" (Billy Rose, Mabel Wayne) - 2:23
"At Long Last Love" (Cole Porter) - 2:15 
"I Get a Kick Out of You" (Porter) - 2:49 
"Just One of Those Things" (Porter) - 3:02 
"A Foggy Day" (George Gershwin, Ira Gershwin) - 3:31 
"The Lady is a Tramp" (Richard Rodgers, Lorenz Hart) - 3:18 
"They Can't Take That Away from Me" (G. Gershwin, I. Gershwin) - 1:40 
"I Won't Dance" (Dorothy Fields, Oscar Hammerstein II, Otto Harbach, Jimmy McHugh) - 3:26
Sinatra Dialogue - 4:52 
"When Your Lover Has Gone" (Enir A. Swan) - 2:53 
"Violets for Your Furs" (Tom Adair, Matt Dennis) - 3:34 
"My Funny Valentine" (Rodgers, Hart) - 2:44
"Glad to Be Unhappy" (Rodgers, Hart) - 1:37 
"One for My Baby (and One More for the Road)" (Harold Arlen, Johnny Mercer) - 4:01 
"(Love Is) The Tender Trap" (Sammy Cahn, Jimmy Van Heusen) - 4:12 
"Hey! Jealous Lover" (Cahn, Kay Twomey, Bee Walker) - 2:21 
"I've Got You Under My Skin" (Porter) - 3:15 
"Oh! Look at Me Now" (Joe Bushkin, John DeVries) - 3:12

Personnel
 Frank Sinatra - Vocals
 Nelson Riddle - Conductor
 Bill Miller - Piano
 Al Viola - Guitar
 Irving Cottler - Drums

References

Frank Sinatra live albums
Live albums published posthumously
1999 live albums
Albums conducted by Nelson Riddle